Peak debt is a term meaning borrowing limit, in the same way peak water is a term meaning water limit.

Peak debt is the stage at which an economy or an individual's debt servicing costs become so high relative to income that spending must slow down or stop. The term 'peak debt' was coined by Jaswant Jain PhD in 2006. Jain concluded that debt will eventually reach a limit at which point consumption must be reduced to pay the debt and interest. This reduction in consumption will inevitably have a deflationary or  disinflationary effect.

Seemingly, the first person to use peak debt in relation to house prices was Michael McNamara. He contends that, specifically house prices have risen dramatically through the increased borrowing power of purchasers. This was facilitated through rapidly expanding loan to valuation ratios adopted by lenders since the deregulation of financial markets in the early 1980s. Logically, the argument posed states that as growth in credit slows limited by incomes, so too shall the price growth in housing become more subdued.

Since then, growth in asset markets and median property values have been outstripping incomes in many countries, and some people believe the corresponding international, national and household debt levels are unsustainable. To many people, it seems impossible for prices to keep rising faster than incomes, because eventually so much would be spent on debt servicing costs that there would be no money remaining for anything else.

Some observers such as Professor Steve Keen of University of Western Sydney, believe that many countries are hurtling towards peak debt, fueled by excess borrowing and an addiction to credit. To such observers, it appears illogical to take on ever increasing debt just to bid against each other for the same assets. Nations must at some stage reach their maximum debt limit. The timeframe for reaching this limit is always unknown but some believe we are at that limit already, or very close, in many countries.

Ron Laszewski attempts to determine the peak debt limit for America in his 2008 Peak Debt paper. Since the Bureau of Economic Analysis has statistics on how much Americans earn, how much they save, and how much they spend on debt servicing, it was possible for Laszewski to estimate how close America might be to a peak debt limit.

The term 'peak debt' has similar origins to other 'peaks' such as peak oil, peak water, peak food, peak minerals, and peak population.

Articles

Notes

Debt